The Norwich Evening News is a daily local newspaper published in Norwich, Norfolk, England.  It covers the city and the surrounding suburbs, and is published by Archant. It is the best-selling newspaper in Norwich. As of 28 February 2011 the paper is printed for 6am, as the stories are written the day before.

The Norwich Evening News is sister paper to the Eastern Daily Press, and has a cover price of 50p.

On July 1, 2021 it was announced that Richard Porritt would be the paper's new editor after leaving his previous role as Politics and Business Editor at the Eastern Daily Press.

See also
Eastern Daily Press, Archant publication covering East Anglia

References

External links
Norwich Evening News

Newspapers published in Norfolk
Mass media in Norwich
Daily newspapers published in the United Kingdom